The 35th International Film Festival of India was held from November 29 - December 9 2004 in Goa. The edition is the first globally competitive edition with a permanent venue at Goa. The "Beach Screening"
section of Hollywood blockbusters was instituted for the first time at this edition.

Winners
Golden Peacock (Best Film):  "The Beautiful City" by "Asghar Farhadi" (Iranian film)
Special Jury Award: Silver Peacock: Actor "Faramarz Gharibian" for  "The Beautiful City" 
Silver Peacock Award for the Most Promising Asian Director: "Ekachai Uekrongtham" for "Beautiful Boxer" (Thai film)
Silver Peacock Special Jury Award:  "Old Women" by "Gennady Sidorov" (Russian film)

Official selections

Special screenings

Opening film
“Vanity Fair” by "Meera Nair"

Closing film
"Alexander" by "Oliver Stone"

References

2004 film festivals
35th
2004 in Indian cinema